Mehdi Hamidi Shirazi (born 1914 Shiraz, Iran, died 1 July 1986, Tehran, Iran) was an Iranian poet and university professor.

works 

 Šokufahā yā naḡmahā-ye jadid, a selection of poems, Shiraz, 1938 (collections of poetry)
 Baʿd az yak sāl, Shiraz, 1940  (collections of poetry)
 ʿEšq-e dar ba dar, 3 vols., Shiraz, 1940-52  (collections of poetry)
 Ašk-e maʿšuq (The tears of the beloved), Shiraz, 1942  (collections of poetry)
 Sālhā-ye siāh (on the colonial policy of Great Britain, the communist takeover of Azerbaijan, and the tribal uprising in Fārs after World War II), Tehran, 1946 (suppressed) (collections of poetry)
 Šāʿer dar āsmān, Shiraz, 1942
 Zamzama-ye behešt
 Fonun o anvāʿ-e šeʿr-e fārsi, Tehran, 1973a
 Dah farmān, collection of poems, Tehran, 1965
 Fereštagān-e zamin (Angels of the earth), prose, 1942
 Sabok-sarihā-ye ghalam (The frivolities of the pen), prose, Tehran, ca. 1943
 Ṭelesm-e šekasta, 1945
 Šāhkārhā-ye Ferdowsi, Tehran, 1947
 Daryā-ye gowhar, an anthology of contemporary prose, poetry and translations, 3 vols., Tehran, 1950-59 (vol. 3 reviewed by Iraj Afšār, in Yaḡmā 9/2, 1954, pp. 94–95)
 Behešt-e soḵan, a select anthology of classical Persian poetry with critical commentaries, 2 vols., Tehran, 1958–59
 ʿAruż-e Ḥamidi, on Persian prosody, Tehran, 1963
 ʿAṭṭār dar maṯnavihā-ye gozida-ye u wa gozida-ye maṯnawihā-ye u, Tehran, 1968
 “Taṣvir-e šeʿr-e ghadim dar masir-e šeʿr-e jadid”, Armaḡān 40, 1971, pp. 361–64, 442-45, 514-16, 589-91, 680-83
 “Baḥṯ-i dar bāra-ye Saʿdi,” in Manṣur Rastgār Fasāʾi, ed., Saʿdi, Shiraz, 1973b, pp. 70–127; “ʿElm-e bayān,” Ḵerad wa kušeš, no. 1, 1978, pp. 95–114; 
 Fonun-e šeʿr va kālbodhā-ye pulādin-e ān, a collection of poems, Tehran, 1984
 Šeʿr dar ʿaṣr-e Qājār, Tehran, 1985; Divān, Tehran, 1988. His major translation is of W. Somerset Maugham’s The Moon and Sixpence, as Māh wa šeš peni, Tehran, 1950.

References 

1914 births
1986 deaths
20th-century Iranian poets
Iranian scholars
Iranian male poets
20th-century male writers